() is a traditional Dutch bread topping. While customary on bread, they are traditionally eaten on beschuit, or rusk. Muisjes is a registered trademark of Koninklijke De Ruijter BV. Muisjes are made of aniseeds with a sugared and colored outer layer. They are currently only produced by the Dutch food processing company De Ruijter, a brand acquired by Heinz in 2001.

Etymology
It's uncertain why the name "little mice" was chosen. It may have been that the stem of the seed reminded people of a mouse's tail, or it may have been that the mouse's fast reproductive cycle was further used as symbolism for healthy childbirth. In Belgium it refers to droppings of the mice.

Beschuit met muisjes

In the Netherlands, it is customary at the birth of a baby to eat muisjes on top of rusk—beschuit met muisjes (met meaning "with"); the anise in the muisjes symbolized fertility and was thought to stimulate lactation and to restore the uterus to its former size. Beschuit with muisjes is typically brought by older siblings to share with classmates at school or by parents to share with colleagues at work.

The exact origin of giving away muisjes is unknown, but likely stems from traditions dating back to the Middle Ages. Because childbirth used to be very dangerous for women, births without complications were celebrated extensively. A treat—usually something sweet—was given to visitors as a supposed "gift" from the newborn child. Muisjes started being produced in the Netherlands in the 18th century, and replaced sugar as the favourite topping used on beschuit to symbolise successful childbirth. However, beschuit was quite expensive at the time and mostly reserved for festivities organised by the wealthy, so most people instead ate sugary white bread until beschuit became cheaper. When pink muisjes were introduced in 1860, they became the standard with births of female babies while the original white muisjes remained in use with male ones. With the introduction of blue muisjes in 1994, blue has become the standard with boys instead.

De Ruijter is currently the largest brand in production of muisjes and has been producing them since 1860. The company managed to repopularize the dish when in 1938 the Dutch royal family was given a large can of orange muisjes (orange is the color of the Dutch royal family, the House of Orange-Nassau) in celebration of the birth of princess Beatrix. Orange muisjes were again sold for only one week in December 2003, in honour of the birth of future crown princess Catharina-Amalia.

Gestampte muisjes
Gestampte muisjes ("crushed muisjes") are muisjes crushed to powder, which are sprinkled onto a slice of bread or a Dutch rusk over butter, a customary breakfast food for Dutch children.

See also

 Beschuit met muisjes, a 1910 play by Herman Heijermans
 Fairy bread
 Hagelslag, a Dutch bread topping made of chocolate or flavored sugar
 Suikerboon, or "sugar bean", the equivalent food on the occasion of a birth in Flanders
 Mukhwas

References

Dutch confectionery
Dutch cuisine
Dutch words and phrases
Sandwiches
Anise